David Anders Whiteley (October 21, 1944 - August 13, 2017) was an American Thoroughbred horse racing trainer who trained three Champions and who in 1979 won the third leg of the U.S. Triple Crown.

The son of U.S. Racing Hall of Fame inductee Frank Y. Whiteley, Jr. who trained the great filly Ruffian, David grew up in the industry. In a career that began in 1970 he won 678 races, including 45 graded stakes, until his retirement in 1995.

David Whiteley's win with Coastal in the 1979 Belmont Stakes ended the Triple Crown hopes of Spectacular Bid.

His three Champions were all female horses:
 Revidere, 1976 American Champion Three-Year-Old Filly for William Haggin Perry
 Waya, 1979 American Champion Older Female Horse for Peter M. Brant and George W. Strawbridge, Jr.
 Just A Game, 1980 American Champion Female Turf Horse for owners Peter M. Brant and H. Joseph Allen

David A. Whiteley died at his home in Camden, South Carolina on August 13, 2017.

References

1944 births
2017 deaths
American horse trainers
People from Easton, Maryland